The 2007 PartyBets.com Premier League was a professional non-ranking snooker tournament that was played from 6 September to 2 December 2007.

Ronnie O'Sullivan won in the final 7–4 against John Higgins.


Prize fund 
The breakdown of prize money for this year is shown below:
Winner: £50,000
Runner-up: £25,000
Semi-final: £12,500
Frame-win: £1,000
Century break: £1,000
Total: £250,000

League phase

Top four qualified for the play-offs. If points were level then most frames won determined their positions. If two players had an identical record then the result in their match determined their positions. If that ended 3–3 then the player who got to three first was higher. (Breaks above 50 shown between (parentheses); century breaks are indicated with bold.)

 6 September – Olympos, Haywards Heath, England
 Ronnie O'Sullivan 5–1 John Higgins → 63–27, 12–72, 80(68)–37, 124(124)–6, 83–38, 107(83)–7
 Ding Junhui 3–3 Jimmy White → 0–87(86), 142(138)–0, 48–78(70), 128(66, 62)–0, 35–67(66), 103(103)–0
 13 September – Malvern Theatres, Great Malvern, England
 Steve Davis 4–2 Neil Robertson → 67–50, 74(73)–46, 70(69)–21, 66–15, 38–45, 14–93( 69)
 Stephen Hendry 4–2 Ronnie O'Sullivan → 66–52(51), 1–98(98), 104(78)–0, 79–52(52), 95(54)–0, 6–105(101)
 20 September – Dorking Halls, Dorking, England
 John Higgins 3–3 Neil Robertson → 29–60, 87(87)–21, 36–59, 126(126)–1, 65–47, 5–64
 Jimmy White 3–3 Stephen Hendry → 4–113(102), 48–59, 77–0, 72–48, 63–37, 61–64
 27 September – Plymouth Pavilions, Plymouth, England
 Ding Junhui 4–2 Ronnie O'Sullivan → 97(97)–0, 68–0, 137(137)–0, 57–67, 0–141(141), 72–21
 Steve Davis 4–2 Jimmy White → 72–28, 31–56, 65(55)–33, 15–67, 49–14, 97(97)–0
 4 October – Assembly Rooms, Derby, England
 Stephen Hendry 5–1 Neil Robertson → 82(81)–0, 63–54, 77(77)–8, 130(130)–0, 67(67)–51, 50–77(59)
 Ronnie O'Sullivan 4–2 Steve Davis → 105(105)–0, 141(141)–0, 96(96)–24, 75(55)–41, 0–147(143), 4–87
 11 October – Grimsby Auditorium, Grimsby, England
 Stephen Hendry 4–2 John Higgins → 117(63,50)-8, 24–59(53), 61–47, 128(128)–0, 0–128(128), 82–48
 Ronnie O'Sullivan 6–0 Jimmy White → 124(119)–0, 87(51)–0, 69–65, 87(87)–38, 72–37, 92(91)–4
 25 October – The Cresset, Peterborough, England
 Ding Junhui 4–2 Neil Robertson → 8–65(53), 0–128(124), 103(103)–0, 115(115)–1, 73(73)–64(59), 133(133)–0
 Stephen Hendry 4–2 Steve Davis → 0–92(53), 94(58)–0, 101(55)–21, 73(73)–0, 81–21, 29–76(52)
 1 November – Guildford Spectrum, Guildford, England
 Ding Junhui 6–0 Steve Davis → 80–31, 115(115)–0, 110(101)–24, 61(61)–9, 83(60)–0, 104(104)–0
 John Higgins 4–2 Jimmy White →  71(65)–1, 106(105)–4, 64(64)–0, 59–68, 54–32, 8–93
 15 November – Glades Arena, Kidderminster, England
 John Higgins 4–2 Ding Junhui → 67–62, 77(57)–55, 77–14, 44–101, 0–103(94), 84(55)–21
 Ronnie O'Sullivan 5–1 Neil Robertson → 77(57)–19, 114(113 **)–8, 58–56, 111(103)–10, 120(120)–6, 6–123(123)
 22 November – Rothes Halls, Glenrothes, Scotland
 Neil Robertson 3–3 Jimmy White → 36–69, 13–69, 65(51)–27, 42–60, 63(63)–24, 71(50)–17
 Ding Junhui 6–0 Stephen Hendry → 133(133)–0, 88(87)–0, 136(136)–0, 138(138)–0, 75(54)–5, 66–36
 John Higgins 3–3 Steve Davis → 79–16, 60(60)–15, 79–12, 1–69(68), 28–81, 33–74(70)

 ** On 15 November Ronnie O'Sullivan's 113 break in frame two of his 5–1 win over Neil Robertson was the 500th century break of his career.

Play-offs 
1–2 December – AECC, Aberdeen, Scotland

{{4TeamBracket
| RD1 = Semi-finalsBest of 9 frames
| RD2 = FinalBest of 13 frames
| RD1-seed1=1
| RD1-team1= Ding Junhui
| RD1-score1=3
| RD1-seed2=4
| RD1-team2= John Higgins
| RD1-score2=5
| RD1-seed3=2
| RD1-team3= Stephen Hendry
| RD1-score3=1
| RD1-seed4=3
| RD1-team4={{nowrap| Ronnie O'Sullivan}}
| RD1-score4=5
| RD2-seed1=4
| RD2-team1= John Higgins
| RD2-score1=4
| RD2-seed2=3
| RD2-team2=

Semi-Final 1 – Ding Junhui 3–5 John Higgins 40–50, 31–73(60), 100(100)–0, 77–0, 0–116(116), 66–52, 3–119(84), 1–72(72)
Semi-Final 2 – Stephen Hendry 1–5 Ronnie O'Sullivan 17–75(75), 18–80(76), 83–16, 35–87(82), 1–93(92), 48–56
Final – John Higgins 4–7 Ronnie O'Sullivan 73(73)–0, 4–84(54), 49–82(66), 80–26, 77–0, 2–90(80), 29–104(104), 14–86(86), 14–111(110), 108(104)–0, 0–107(69)

Century breaks

143  Steve Davis
141, 141, 124, 120, 119, 113, 110, 105, 104, 103, 101  Ronnie O'Sullivan
138, 138, 137, 136, 133, 133, 115, 115, 104, 103, 103, 101, 100  Ding Junhui
130, 128, 102  Stephen Hendry
128, 126, 116, 105, 104  John Higgins
124, 123  Neil Robertson

Notes

 Ding scored a record 495 points without reply in this match (this was a world record at the time) .

References

2007
Premier League
Premier League Snooker